Templeton Lake is the head of Templeton River, in the Kootenay Land District of British Columbia, Canada.

References

Lakes of British Columbia
Kootenay Land District